Olena Karakuts (born October 1, 1992) is a Ukrainian female acrobatic gymnast. With partners Nadiia Kotliar and Kateryna Bilokon, Karakuts competed in the 2014 Acrobatic Gymnastics World Championships.

References

1998 births
Living people
Ukrainian acrobatic gymnasts
Female acrobatic gymnasts